The Welzheim Forest is a wooded, hill ridge, up to , in the counties of Rems-Murr, Ostalb and Schwäbisch Hall in Baden-Württemberg (Germany).

Geography

Location 
The Welzheim Forest lies just under 38 kilometres east-northeast of Stuttgart and about 45 kilometres southeast of Heilbronn between the Murrhardt Forest and the Mainhardt Forest in the north, the Frickenhofer Höhe in the east-northeast, the Albuch in the southeast, the Schurwald in the southwest and the Berglen and  Buocher Höhe in the west.

At the same time, the Welzheim Forest is one of five forest regions in the Swabian-Franconian Forest Nature Park. As a natural region it is, however, not counted with the Swabian-Franconian Forest but, together with the Schurwald and the Berglen, forms its own natural region. It takes its name from the town of Welzheim in the centre of the region.

The Welzheim Forest is located around Welzheim, Kaisersbach and Alfdorf roughly between Fichtenberg to the north, Gschwend to the northeast, Spraitbach and Durlangen to the east, Mutlangen and Schwäbisch Gmünd to the southeast, Lorch to the south, Plüderhausen, Urbach and Schorndorf to the southwest, Berglen to the west and Rudersberg and Althütte to the northwest.

Hills 
Amongst the hills of the Welzheim Forest are the following – sorted by height in metres above Normalhöhennull (NHN):
 Hagberg (585.2 m), with the Hagberg Tower; west of Gschwend-Hagkling
 Lichte Eichen (554.3 m), north-northwest of Welzheim-Langenberg
 Haube (536.5 m), immediately northeast of Rudersberg-Mannenberg
 Hohbergkopf (498.8 m), northeast of Plüderhausen
 Kelchenberg (496.1 m), west-southwest of Pfahlbronn
 Heuberg (476.6 m), northeast of Urbach

References

External links 

 Landschaftssteckbrief des BfN
 

 
Mountain and hill ranges of Baden-Württemberg
Natural regions of the Swabian Keuper-Lias Plains
Regions of Baden-Württemberg
Forests and woodlands of Baden-Württemberg
Rems-Murr-Kreis
Ostalbkreis
Schwäbisch Hall (district)